"Let's Go Through the Motions" is a song by American R&B group Jodeci. The song was released as a promotional single for the soundtrack to the 1993 film Who's the Man?

The song peaked at number sixty-five on the Billboard Hot 100 chart.

Release and reception
The song peaked at sixty-five on the U.S. Billboard Hot 100 and thirty-one on the Hot R&B/Hip-Hop Singles & Tracks chart.

Track listings
12", CD, Vinyl
"Let's Go Through the Motions" (Radio Edit) - 4:00
"Let's Go Through the Motions" (DeVante Swing) - 5:08

12", Vinyl
"Let's Go Through the Motions" (Radio) - 4:15
"Let's Go Through the Motions" (Instrumental) - 4:15
"Let's Go Through the Motions" (Intro Radio) - 4:52

Personnel
Information taken from Discogs.
associate producer(s): Buttnaked Tim Dawg, James Earl Jones, Jr.
executive production: Sean "Puffy" Combs, Andre Harrell, Mark Siegel
production: DeVante Swing, Chad "Dr. Ceuss" Elliott
Jojo Hailey - Lead & Background vocals
K-Ci Hailey - Lead & Background vocals
DeVante Swing - Background vocals
Mr. Dalvin - Rap and Background vocals

Chart performance

Notes

1993 singles
Jodeci songs
Song recordings produced by DeVante Swing
Songs written by DeVante Swing
1992 songs
Uptown Records singles